Don Martín de Bertendona (Bilbao, 1530–1604) was an important officer of the Spanish Navy under Philip II and Philip III. He participated in the Spanish Armada, and had a role in the capture of the iconic English galleon Revenge in 1591.

Origins and early career
Don Martín de Bertendona came from a prominent seafaring family in Bilbao. They had a shipyard and a merchant fleet, but they also played a prestigious role in the Spanish navy. One of their ships served as the royal flagship in 1522 and 1554. The young Martín de Bertendona was bred to naval warfare from boyhood, seeing his first campaign in 1546.

By 1583, Don Martín had risen to command the fleet that guarded the Atlantic coast while the commander-in-chief was securing the Azores. In 1587, he played a senior role in planning, organizing and leading the Spanish Armada. In the campaign itself, he commanded the Levant Squadron, a force of huge Mediterranean cargo ships carrying troops and equipment for the projected campaign in England; his flagship was the largest vessel in the campaign, but she was lightly armed, best suited for a close-range boarding action.

Although Don Martín had correctly predicted the key challenges that the campaign would face - the lack of a secure deep-water anchorage, and the ability of the English galleons to refuse close-quarters battle - he believed that the Spanish would still had won if they had pressed the attack at Gravelines.

Bertendona brought his flagship safely home to Spain, and in 1589, he participated in the successful defence of A Coruña against the invasion attempt of Sir Francis Drake. He then became a regular participant in the Brittany Campaign.

Capture of the Revenge
English sources present the last fight of the Revenge as a heroic rearguard action by a single English ship against fifty Spanish galleons, but Spanish reports tell a different story, portraying the battle almost as a single-ship action between Don Martín and Sir Richard Grenville.

They show that fleeing English fleet was overhauled by the two ships of Don Martín's Bilbao squadron; the larger San Felipe reached the Revenge first, but failed to grapple close, and was driven off by English gunfire; then Don Martín's flagship, the smaller San Bernabé, caught up - slowing the English ship by slicing his bowsprit through her foresail, then grappling close alongside.

Don Martín then settled into a long, grim duel, using artillery and musket fire, and keeping his men under cover; he did not attempt to storm the English ship's decks, a tactic that proved disastrous for three other Spaniards that attempted it as dusk fell.

By the next morning, the San Bernabé had pounded the pride of the English navy into surrender.

Later career
In 1592, Bertendona led a squadron across the Bay of Biscay in support of the Catholic League, with the repaired San Bernabé as flagship. In 1596–7, Don Martín was involved as a senior subordinate commander in renewed preparations to invade England, but these were hindered by delays and bad storms.

Early in 1598, he assumed overall command, and successfully led the Spanish fleet up the English Channel - but now their destination was the Spanish Netherlands, and the priority was the war with Holland. Bertendona argued unsuccessfully for a campaign against England, and after the Peace of Vervins, he returned to Spain.

Further expeditions in 1601 and 1602 were called off by his superiors, but since 1588, Don Martín had also commanded the naval forces of his home province of Biscay, and he focused his energies on the construction of a new fleet, including fast ships inspired by the Dunkirk frigates.

Don Martín de Bertendona lived to see England sue for peace in 1604; almost immediately afterwards, he hauled down his flag, and died.

Sources
 C.R. Boxer, "The Papers of Martín de Bertendona, a Basque admiral of Spain's Golden Age, 1584-1623", Indiana University Bookman 10 (1969), pp. 3–23
 D. Goodman, Spanish Naval Power, 1589-1665: Reconstruction and Defeat (Cambridge 2003)
 C. Lloyd, "Further English Voyages to Spanish America, 1583-1594" (book review), Mariner's Mirror 38-40 (1952), p. 160
 M. Gracia Rivas, "La campaña de Bretaña (1590-1598): una amenaza para Inglaterra", in IX jornadas de historia marítina después de la Gran Armada, la historia desconocida, 1588-16--: ciclo de conferencias, abril 1993 (Cuadernos monográficos del Instituto de Historia y Cultura Naval 20, Madrid 1993), pp 41–56

External links
 John Barratt, Sir Richard Grenville and the last Fight of the Revenge, 1591, at mlitaryhistoryonline.com, accessed 10 July 2011

Spanish admirals
People of the Anglo-Spanish War (1585–1604)
People from Bilbao
1604 deaths
Year of birth unknown
1530 births